In the 2016–17 season, Partizan NIS Belgrade competed in the Basketball League of Serbia, the Radivoj Korać Cup, the Adriatic League and the Champions League.

Players

Roster

Depth chart

Roster changes

In

Out

Competitions

Serbian Super League

Regular season 
League table

Playoffs 
Semifinals

Adriatic League

Standings

Matches

Playoffs

Semifinals

Kup Radivoja Koraća

Quarterfinals

Semifinals

Final

Champions League

League table

Regular season

Play-offs qualifiers

Individual awards
Basketball Champions League

BCL Star Lineup Second Best Team
 Will Hatcher

BCL Game Day MVP
 Novica Veličković – Regular Season, Round 9

Adriatic League

All-ABA League Team
 Novica Veličković

MVP of the Month
 Stefan Birčević – February 2017

MVP of the Round
 Will Hatcher – Round 2
 Stefan Birčević – Round 23
 Stefan Birčević – Semi-finals, Game 2

Basketball League of Serbia

MVP of the Round
 Branislav Ratkovica – Round 9

Statistics

Basketball Champions League

Adriatic League

References

External links
 Official website
 Partizan at ABA League.com 

2016-17
2016–17 in Serbian basketball by club
Partizan